The Journal of Reinforced Plastics and Composites is a peer-reviewed scientific journal that covers research in the field of materials science, especially plastics and composites. The editor-in-chief is G. Springer (Stanford University). It was established in 1982 and is currently published by SAGE Publications.

Abstracting and indexing 
The Journal of Reinforced Plastics and Composites is abstracted and indexed in Scopus, and the Science Citation Index Expanded. According to Journal Citation Reports, its 2020 impact factor is 3.710.

References

External links 
 

SAGE Publishing academic journals
English-language journals
Biweekly journals
Materials science journals
Publications established in 1982